Bojan Mitic (born 27 August 1985) is a Paralympian Track and field athlete from Switzerland competing mainly in category T34 sprint events.

Personal history
Mitic was born in Lucerne in Switzerland in 1985. He was born premature which resulted in cerebral palsy. He is an engineer by trade.

Athletics career
Mitic first represented Switzerland at the 2004 Summer Paralympics in Athens. He entered three sprint events but did not finish in a podium place. At the 2012 Summer Paralympics in London he finished just outside the medal positions in fourth in both the T34 100m and 200m sprints. In 2015 in Doha, Mitic won a bronze medal at the World Championships in Doha in the 100m race.

References

Paralympic athletes of Switzerland
Athletes (track and field) at the 2004 Summer Paralympics
Athletes (track and field) at the 2012 Summer Paralympics
Living people
1985 births
Sportspeople from Lucerne
Swiss male sprinters